Plagodis fervidaria, the fervid plagodis, is a species of geometrid moth in the family Geometridae. It is found in North America.

The MONA or Hodges number for Plagodis fervidaria is 6843.

References

Further reading

External links

 

Ennominae
Articles created by Qbugbot
Moths described in 1855